Tim Bowling (born 1964 in Vancouver, British Columbia) is a Guggenheim winning Canadian novelist and poet. He spent his youth in Ladner, British Columbia, and now lives in Edmonton, Alberta. He has published four novels. He was a judge for the 2015 Griffin Poetry Prize.

Awards and recognition
 2002: Canadian Authors Association, winner of poetry award, Darkness and Silence 
 2003: Finalist for Governor General's Award for poetry, The Witness Ghost
 2004: Finalist for Governor General's Award for poetry, The Memory Orchard
 2004: Alberta Literary Awards, winner of the Georges Bugnet Award for Novel, The Paperboy's Winter 
 2008: Guggenheim Fellowship
 2012: Rogers Writers' Trust Fiction Prize finalist for The Tinsmith.

Bibliography
 1995: Low Water Slack (Nightwood Editions) 
 1997: Dying Scarlet (Nightwood Editions) 
 2000: Downriver Drift (Harbour Publishing) 
 2001: Darkness and Silence (Nightwood Editions) 
 2002: Where the words come from: Canadian poets in conversation, as editor (Nightwood Editions) 
 2003: The Witness Ghost (Nightwood Editions) 
 2003: The Paperboy's Winter (Penguin) 
 2004: The Memory Orchard (Brick Books) 
 2004: In The Suicide's Library (Gaspereau Press) 
 2006: Fathom (Gaspereau Press) paperback: , hardcover: 
 2007: The Bone Sharps (Gaspereau Press) 
 2007: The Lost Coast: Salmon, Memory and the Death of Wild Culture (Nightwood Editions) 
 2008: The Book Collector (Nightwood Editions) 
 2010: The Annotated Bee and Me  (Gaspereau Press) 
 2010: Between Rainfalls (Barbarian Press) 
 2011: Tenderman (Nightwood) 
 2012: The Tinsmith (Brindle & Glass) 
 2014: Circa Nineteen Hundred and Grief (Gaspereau Press)

References

External links
Nightwood Editions: Tim Bowling
Writers Union of Canada: Tim Bowling
Records of Nightwood Editions are held by Simon Fraser University's Special Collections and Rare Books

1964 births
Living people
Canadian male novelists
Canadian male poets
People from Delta, British Columbia
Writers from Vancouver
20th-century Canadian male writers
20th-century Canadian novelists
20th-century Canadian poets
21st-century Canadian male writers
21st-century Canadian novelists
21st-century Canadian poets